This is a listing of the horses that finished in either first, second, or third place and the number of starters in the Harrison E. Johnson Memorial Handicap (1986-present), an American Thoroughbred Stakes race for horses three years-old and up at 1⅛ miles (nine furlongs) on the dirt at Laurel Park Racecourse in Laurel, Maryland.

See also 

Harrison E. Johnson Memorial Handicap
Laurel Park Racecourse

References

 The Conniver Stakes at Pedigree Query

Lists of horse racing results
Laurel Park Racecourse